Jivesh Parasram is a Canadian actor, playwright and theatre director, whose play Take d Milk, Nah? was a nominee for the Governor General's Award for English-language drama at the 2021 Governor General's Awards.

Of Indo-Caribbean descent, Parasram was born and raised in Dartmouth, Nova Scotia. He later moved to Toronto, where he was founding director of the Pandemic Theatre company, and then to Vancouver, where he is currently artistic director of Rumble Theatre.

Take d Milk, Nah? was first staged in 2018 by Theatre Passe Muraille, before being published in 2021 by Playwrights Canada Press.

References

21st-century Canadian dramatists and playwrights
21st-century Canadian male writers
21st-century Canadian male actors
Canadian male dramatists and playwrights
Canadian male stage actors
Canadian theatre directors
Canadian people of Indian descent
Canadian writers of Asian descent
Male actors from Halifax, Nova Scotia
Male actors from Vancouver
People from Dartmouth, Nova Scotia
Writers from Halifax, Nova Scotia
Writers from Vancouver
Living people
Year of birth missing (living people)